The Independent Publisher Book Awards, also styled the IPPY Awards, are a set of annual book awards for independently published titles. They are the longest-running unaffiliated contest open exclusively to independent presses. The IPPY Awards are open to authors and publishers worldwide who produce books written in English and intended for the North American market. According to the IPPY website, the awards "reward those who exhibit the courage, innovation, and creativity to bring about change in the world of publishing."

History 
The IPPY Awards were founded in 1996 by the Small Press publishing magazine. In 1998, Small Press became the Independent Publisher magazine, but continued to run the annual IPPY Awards. The IPPY's mission statement claims that the awards are intended to "recognize the deserving but often unsung titles published by independent authors and publishers, and bring them to the attention of booksellers, buyers, librarians, and book lovers around the world." The IPPY criteria for an "independent" publication mandates that all entries must be from publications that are either 1) independently owned and operated, 2) operated by a foundation or university, or 3) long-time independents that became incorporated but operate autonomously and publish fewer than 50 titles a year. 

The first IPPY awards received 325 entries and awarded 90 gold, silver, and bronze medals.  In 2020, over 3,000 books were entered into the IPPYs, and 422 medals were awarded. In 25 years, IPPY entry categories have expanded from the 28 available in 1996 to more than a hundred options in 2020, including separate categories for specific genres, regions, and E-books.

Entry and prize consideration 
Entry is chargeable. In 2020, the entry fee was $85. Entry discounts for regional and E-book categories are often available. For the 25th anniversary IPPY Awards in 2021, a $25 off discount was available for early submissions. 

Entries are judged based on first impression, design, originality, use of language, message delivery, and relevance.  IPPY medalists receive certificates, medals, and book sticker seals. They also have the option to purchase additional merchandise, including plaques, electronic images, and additional medals and seals. 

About 2,400 publishers throughout the English-speaking world participate in the awards each year. In 2017 the contest drew over 5,000 entries, and medals were awarded to authors and publishers from 43 U.S. states, seven Canadian provinces and 15 countries. In 2020, medals were awarded to authors and publishers from all 50 U.S. states, 10 Canadian provinces, and 61 countries.

Outstanding Book of the Year 
In 2010, the IPPYs introduced additional "Outstanding Book of the Year" awards. Every IPPY submission is considered for an Outstanding Book award, regardless of category. The outstanding medalists are chosen for exemplifying "daring spirit" with a book that is "the most heartfelt, unique, outspoken and experimental among all entries." In 2020, there were eleven Outstanding Books in eight categories:

 Most Original Concept
 Best Book Arts Craftsmanship
 Most Outstanding Design
 Most Likely to Save the Planet
 Independent Spirit Award
 Independent Voice Award
 Freedom Fighter
 Peacemaker

Notable Outstanding Books of the Year include Peter Kalmus’ Being the Change: Live Well and Spark a Climate Revolution, which was named 2018’s Most Likely To Save the Planet, as well as Warren Lehrer’s A Life in Books: The Rise and Fall of Bleu Mobley, 2014’s Most Original Concept.

Recipients 
Books by IPPY winners in 2016, 2017 and 2018 were published by university presses including Princeton, Stanford, Yale, Wisconsin, Iowa, and other major university presses. Among the fiction gold medalists was Elena Ferrante's The Story of the Lost Child, originally published in Italy and issued in English by Europa.  

Previous winners in fiction categories include the small presses Milkweed, Coffee House, Graywolf, The Other Press, McPherson, Europa, and McSweeney's. IPPY Gold Medal winner Lord of Misrule also won the National Book Award and The Patience Stone also won France's Prix Goncourt for its French edition. David Eggers won a 2003 Outstanding Book of the Year for A Heartbreaking Work of Staggering Genius. Margaret Atwood won in 2003 for Negotiating with the Dead: A Writer on Writing. Juan Felipe Herrera, the United States Poet Laureate, won an IPPY gold medal in 2005 for Featherless (Desplumado). Randal Graham won in 2018 the IPPY gold medal in fantasy fiction for Beforelife.

Categories and regions 
General Categories:

 Fine Art
 Performing Arts (Music/Dance/Cinema/Theater)
 Photography
 Architecture
 Coffee Table Books
 Popular Fiction
 Literary Fiction
 Short Story Fiction
 Poetry - Standard
 Poetry - Specialty
 Anthologies
 Juvenile Fiction
 Young Adult Fiction
 Fantasy
 Science Fiction
 LGBT+ Fiction
 Erotica
 Historical Fiction
 Military/Wartime Fiction
 Horror
 Multicultural Fiction
 Multicultural Fiction – Juv-Young Adult
 Mystery/Cozy/Noir
 Suspense/Thriller
 Religious Fiction
 Romance
 Urban Fiction
 Visionary / New Age Fiction
 True Crime
 Graphic Novel/Drawn Book 
 Humor
 Children's Picture Books (7 & Under)
 Children's Picture Books (All ages)
 Children's Interactive
 Juvenile-Young Adult Non-Fiction
 Multicultural N-F Juv-Young Adult
 Multicultural Non-Fiction Adult
 Essay
 Creative Non-Fiction
 Autobiography/Memoir I (Celebrity/Political/Romance)
 Autobiography/Memoir II (Coming of Age/Family Legacy/Travel)
 Autobiography/Memoir III (Personal Struggle/Health Issues)
 Biography
 Aging/Death & Dying
 Animals/Pets
 Business/Career/Sales
 Cookbooks – General
 Cookbooks – Specialty
 Current Events I (Political/Economic/Foreign Affairs)
 Current Events II (Social Issues/Humanitarian)
 Education I (Workbook/Resource)
 Education II (Commentary/Theory)
 Nature
 Environment/Ecology
 Finance/Investment/Economics
 LGBT+ Non-Fiction
 Gift/Specialty/Journal
 Holiday
 Health/Medicine/Nutrition
 History (U.S.)
 History (World)
 Home/Garden/Crafts
 Inspirational/Spiritual
 New Age/Mind-Body-Spirit
 Parenting
 Popular Culture
 Psychology/Mental Health
 Sports/Fitness/Recreation
 Reference
 Religion (Eastern/Western)
 Science
 Self Help
 Sexuality/Relationships
 Transportation (Auto/Aviation/Railroad, etc.)
 Travel – Essay
 Travel – Guidebook
 Women's Issues
 Writing/Publishing
 Book/Author/Publisher Website
 Cover Design – Fiction
 Cover Design – Non-Fiction
 Cover Design – Non-Fiction Oversize
 Best First Book – Fiction
 Best First Book – Non-Fiction
 Book Series - Fiction
 Book Series - Non-Fiction (note: Book Series category submissions require at least two volumes, with one volume's copyright/release date falling within the 2018–2020 time frame)
 Audiobook - Fiction
 Audiobook - Non-Fiction

E-Book Categories

 Best Adult Fiction E-Book
 Best Romance/Erotica E-Book
 Best Mystery/Thriller E-Book
 Best Sci-Fi/Fantasy/Horror E-Book
 Best Adult Non-Fiction Personal E-Book
 Best Adult Non-Fiction Informational E-Book
 Best Juvenile/Young Adult Fiction E-Book
 Best Children's Illustrated E-Book
 Best Regional E-Book – Fiction
 Best Regional E-Book – Non-Fiction
 Best E-Book Design

Regional Categories (Awards for "Best Fiction" and "Best Non-Fiction" in each region) 

 Northeast (ME, VT, NH, MA, RI, CT, NY)
 Mid- Atlantic (PA, WV, VA, DE, MD, DC, NJ)
 Southeast (KY, NC, SC, GA, FL, AL)
 South (MS, LA, AR, TX, TN)
 Great Lakes (OH, MI, IN, IL, WI)
 Midwest (MN, IA, MO, OK, KS, NE, SD, ND)
 West-Mountain (MT, WY, UT, CO, NM, AZ, ID, NV)
 West-Pacific (CA, OR, WA, HI, AK)
 Canada-East (ON, QB, NF, NB, NS, PE, Nunavut)
 Canada-West (BC, AB, SK, MB, NW Territories, Yukon)
 Australia/New Zealand/Pacific Rim
 Europe

Criticism 
The IPPY Awards were criticized by Writer Beware, an advocacy website sponsored by the Science Fiction and Fantasy Writers of America (SFWA), which stated that it was one of several profiteer awards run by the Jenkins Group and that "Even among profiteers, however, Jenkins is unusual in the amount of extra merchandise it hawks to winners." The site classified profiteer awards as awards that are aimed at "making money for the sponsor. Such awards aren't really about honoring writers at all."

References 

1996 establishments in the United States
American literary awards
Awards established in 1996